Carabus perrini is a species of beetle in the family Carabidae that can be found in South Russia, Ukraine, and Georgia.

Subspecies
Carabus perrini perrini Dejean, 1831
Carabus perrini planus Gehin, 1885

References

perrini
Beetles described in 1831